The  is an approximately 400-year-old cherry tree growing out of a crack in a granite boulder in front of the district courthouse in Morioka, the capital of Iwate Prefecture in the Tōhoku region of northern Japan.  It is a ten-minute walk from Morioka Station.

The tree measures 4.3 meters around the base, and is approximately 10 meters in height. It was proclaimed a Natural Treasure of Japan in 1923.

References

External links

See also
Hanami

Tourist attractions in Iwate Prefecture
Cherry blossom
Individual trees in Japan
Morioka, Iwate